Henry Oswald Simmons  (born July 1, 1970) is an American actor. He is best known for portraying Alphonso "Mack" Mackenzie in the ABC superhero drama series Agents of S.H.I.E.L.D. (2014–2020) and Baldwin Jones in the ABC police drama series NYPD Blue (2000–2005).

Early life and education
Simmons was born in Stamford, Connecticut. He is the son of Aurelia, a school teacher, and Henry Simmons Sr., an IRS Revenue Officer. He is one of three children, including his twin sister, and another sister.  Simmons earned a basketball scholarship to Franklin Pierce University, where he earned a business degree.

While attending Franklin Pierce University, he experimented in theater. After graduating from college, he briefly worked at a Fortune 500 company in Stamford. Unhappy with his job, Simmons moved to New York City and began to study acting and after a few bit roles, he landed a recurring role on the soap opera Another World.

Career
Simmons played Detective Baldwin Jones on the ABC drama NYPD Blue for six seasons. He had a leading role in the CBS legal drama Shark, a leading role in World's Greatest Dad, and the ABC-TV comedy series Man Up!

His film work includes the 2004 action/comedy film Taxi, From the Rough, and 2014's No Good Deed.

Simmons won the Grand Jury Award for Best Actor at the American Black Film Festival, for his portrayal of Dr. Walter Chambers in the 2007 film South of Pico.

From 2014 to 2020, Simmons starred in the ABC superhero drama series Marvel's Agents of S.H.I.E.L.D., portraying S.H.I.E.L.D. Director Alphonso "Mack" Mackenzie. After being a recurring character in the second season, he was promoted to a series regular for season 3, and for all remaining seasons.

In 2021 he was cast as the lead in the Ava DuVernay series, Cherish the Day.

Personal life
Simmons married actress Sophina Brown in May 2010.

Filmography

Film

Television

References

External links

 

1970 births
Living people
African-American male actors
American male film actors
American male television actors
Franklin Pierce University alumni
Male actors from Stamford, Connecticut
20th-century American male actors
21st-century American male actors
20th-century African-American people
21st-century African-American people